Parviterebra is a small genus of sea snails in the family Columbellidae. Species of this genus occur off Réunion and Australia.

Species
There are six species in the genus Parviterebra:
 Parviterebra brazieri (Angas, 1875)
 Parviterebra paucivolvis Pilsbry, 1904
 Parviterebra separanda Tomlin, 1923
 Parviterebra thyraea (Melvill, 1897)
 Parviterebra trilineata (A. Adams & Angas, 1864)
 Parviterebra turriformis Drivas & Jay, 1990

References

 Wilson, B. 1994. Australian marine shells. Prosobranch gastropods. Kallaroo, WA : Odyssey Publishing Vol. 2 370 pp.
 Drivas, J. & Jay, M., 1990. The Columbellidae of Reunion Island (Mollusca: Gastropoda). Annals of the Natal Museum 31: 163-200

External links
 Pilsbry, H. A. (1904). New Japanese marine Mollusca: Gastropoda. Proceedings of the Academy of Natural Sciences of Philadelphia. 56: 3-32

Columbellidae